Jason Stewart (born November 14, 1980) is an American football defensive tackle who currently plays for the FCF Beasts. He was signed by the Indianapolis Colts as an undrafted free agent in 2003. He played college football at Fresno State.

Stewart has also played for the Los Angeles Avengers.

External links
 Just Sports Stats
 Fresno State Bulldogs bio 

1980 births
Living people
Players of American football from Bakersfield, California
American football defensive tackles
Fresno State Bulldogs football players
Indianapolis Colts players
Los Angeles Avengers players
Sacramento Mountain Lions players
San Jose SaberCats players